Denkel is a Turkish surname. Notable people with the surname include:

 Arda Denkel (1949–2000), Turkish philosopher
 Gökçen Denkel (born 1985), Turkish volleyball player

See also
 Denzel (disambiguation)

Turkish-language surnames